The 1952 Delaware Fightin' Blue Hens football team was an American football team that represented the University of Delaware as an independent during the 1952 college football season. In its second season under head coach David M. Nelson, the team compiled a 4–4 record and outscored opponents by a total of 134 to 122. Paul Mueller was the team captain. The team played its home games at Wilmington Park in Wilmington, Delaware, and for the final two games at Delaware Stadium in Newark, Delaware .

Schedule

References

Delaware
Delaware Fightin' Blue Hens football seasons
Delaware Fightin' Blue Hens football